Vadim Dmitriyevich Minich (born 7 October 1986) is a former Russian professional football player.

Club career
He played two seasons in the Russian Football National League for FC SKA-Energiya Khabarovsk and FC Luch-Energiya Vladivostok.

External links
 
 

1986 births
People from Dyatkovsky District
Living people
Russian footballers
Association football midfielders
FC Dynamo Bryansk players
FC Rotor Volgograd players
FC SKA-Khabarovsk players
FC Tambov players
FC Luch Vladivostok players
Sportspeople from Bryansk Oblast